is a railway station on the Kagoshima Main Line in Kumamoto, Japan, operated by Kyushu Railway Company (JR Kyushu). It opened on 26 March 2016.

Lines

Station layout
The station is unstaffed, with ticket barriers on the ground floor level, and the platforms on the second floor level. The platforms are approximately 85 m long, able to handle four-car local trains.

Adjacent stations

History
A public ballot for the new station name was held between February and March, with the name "Nishi-Kumamoto" officially announced by JR Kyushu on 23 July 2015. The total cost of building the station is approximately 1.25 billion yen, funded by the city of Kumamoto, with 380 million yen funded by a national grant.

Passenger statistics
According to Kumamoto city forecasts, approximately 1,200 passengers are expected to use the station daily.

Surrounding area
 Aeon Town Nishi-Kumamoto shopping mall
 Rikigo Junior High School
  National Route 3
  National Route 57

See also
 List of railway stations in Japan

References

External links

 JR Kyushu station information 
 July 2015 news release 

Stations of Kyushu Railway Company
Railway stations in Kumamoto Prefecture
Railway stations in Japan opened in 2016